The Polyforum Dr. Rodolfo Torre Cantú is an indoor arena located in Nuevo Laredo, Tamaulipas. It is currently used mostly for Basketball matches  The stadium has a capacity of 5,224 people.

References

External links

Rodolfo Torre Cantú
Volleyball venues in Mexico
Basketball venues in Mexico
Sports venues in Tamaulipas